Melania Albea (born 5 March 1980 in Zürich, Switzerland) is a Swiss former figure skater, who also competed internationally for Spain. She competed for Switzerland until the 1998/1999 season and then switched to representing Spain. She is the 2000-2001 Spanish national silver medalist and the 2002 national bronze medalist.

Results

References

External links
 

Spanish female single skaters
Swiss female single skaters
Living people
1980 births
Figure skaters from Zürich